Troponin I, cardiac muscle is a protein that in humans is encoded by the TNNI3 gene.
It is a tissue-specific subtype of troponin I, which in turn is a part of the troponin complex.

The TNNI3 gene encoding cardiac troponin I (cTnI) is located at 19q13.4 in the human chromosomal genome. Human cTnI is a 24 kDa protein consisting of 210 amino acids with isoelectric point (pI) of 9.87. cTnI is exclusively expressed in adult cardiac muscle.

Gene evolution 

cTnI has diverged from the skeletal muscle isoforms of TnI (slow TnI and fast TnI) mainly with a unique N-terminal extension. The amino acid sequence of cTnI is strongly conserved among mammalian species (Fig. 1). On the other hand, the N-terminal extension of cTnI has significantly different structures among mammal, amphibian and fish.

Tissue distribution 

TNNI3 is expressed as a heart specific gene. Early embryonic heart expresses solely slow skeletal muscle TnI. cTnI begins to express in mouse heart at approximately embryonic day 10, and the level gradually increases to one-half of the total amount of TnI in the cardiac muscle at birth. cTnI completely replaces slow TnI in the mouse heart approximately 14 days after birth

Protein structure 

Based on in vitro
structure-function relationship studies, the structure of cTnI can be divided into six functional segments: a) a cardiac-specific N-terminal extension (residue 1–30) that is not present in fast TnI and slow TnI; b)
an N-terminal region (residue 42–79) that binds the C domain of TnC; c) a TnT-binding region (residue 80–136); d) the inhibitory peptide (residue 128–147) that interacts with TnC and actin–tropomyosin; e) the switch or triggering region (residue 148–163) that binds the N domain of TnC; and f) the C-terminal mobile domain (residue 164–210) that binds actin–tropomyosin and is the most conserved segment highly similar among isoforms and across species. Partially crystal structure of human troponin has been determined.

Posttranslational modifications 

 Phosphorylation: cTnI was the first sarcomeric protein identified to be a substrate of PKA. Phosphorylation of cTnI at Ser23/Ser24 under adrenergic stimulation enhances relaxation of cardiac muscle, which is critical to cardiac function especially at fast heart rate. Whereas PKA phosphorylation of Ser23/Ser24 decreases myofilament Ca2+ sensitivity and increases relaxation, phosphorylation of Ser42/Ser44 by PKC increases Ca2+ sensitivity and decreases cardiac muscle relaxation. Ser5/Ser6, Tyr26, Thr31, Ser39, Thr51, Ser77, Thr78, Thr129, Thr143 and Ser150 are also phosphorylation sites in human cTnI.
 O-linked GlcNAc modification: Studies on isolated cardiomyocytes found increased levels of O-GlcNAcylation of cardiac proteins in hearts with diabetic dysfunction. Mass spectrometry identified Ser150 of mouse cTnI as an O-GlcNAcylation site, suggesting a potential role in regulating myocardial contractility.  
 C-terminal truncation: The C-terminal end segment is the most conserved region of TnI. As an allosteric structure regulated by Ca2+ in the troponin complex, it binds and stabilizes the position of tropomyosin in low Ca2+ state implicating a role in the inhibition of actomyosin ATPase. A deletion of the C-terminal 19 amino acids was found during myocardial ischemia-reperfusion injury in Langendorff perfused rat hearts. It was also seen in myocardial stunning in coronary bypass patients. Over-expression of the C-terminal truncated cardiac TnI (cTnI1-192) in transgenic mouse heart resulted in a phenotype of myocardial stunning with systolic and diastolic dysfunctions. Replacement of intact cTnI with cTnT1-192 in myofibrils and cardiomyocytes did not affect maximal tension development but decreased the rates of force redevelopment and relaxation.
 Restrictive N-terminal truncation: The approximately 30 amino acids N-terminal extension of cTnI is an adult heart-specific structure. The N-terminal extension contains the PKA phosphorylation sites Ser23/Ser24 and plays a role in modulating the overall molecular conformation and function of cTnI. A restrictive N-terminal truncation of cTnI occurs at low levels in normal hearts of all vertebrate species examined including human and significantly increases in adaptation to hemodynamic stress and Gsα deficiency-caused failing mouse hearts. Distinct from the harmful C-terminal truncation, the restrictive N-terminal truncation of cTnI selectively removing the adult heart specific extension forms a regulatory mechanism in cardiac adaptation to physiological and pathological stress conditions.

Pathologic mutations 

Multiple mutations in cTnI have been found to cause cardiomyopathies. cTnI mutations account for approximately 5% of familial hypertrophic cardiomyopathy cases and to date, more than 20 myopathic mutations of cTnI have been characterized.

Clinical implications 

The half-life of cTnI in adult cardiomyocytes is estimated to be ~3.2 days and there is a pool of unassembled cardiac TnI in the cytoplasm. Cardiac TnI is exclusively expressed in the myocardium and is thus a highly specific diagnostic marker for cardiac muscle injuries, and cTnI has been universally used as indicator for myocardial infarction. An increased level of serum cTnI also independently predicts poor prognosis of critically ill patients in the absence of acute coronary syndrome.

Notes

References

Further reading

External links 
  GeneReviews/NIH/NCBI/UW entry on Familial Hypertrophic Cardiomyopathy Overview